Billy Aaron Brown (born July 28, 1981) is an American actor. He is best known for playing the character Kyle on the sitcom 8 Simple Rules and he is also known for his role in Jeepers Creepers 2 (2003).

Early life and education
Brown was born in Clarinda, Iowa. He attended Clarinda High School, and moved to Los Angeles to become an actor at eighteen just after graduating.

Career
A year after moving to Los Angeles, Brown guest starred on the MTV show Undressed. In 2001, he made appearances on the Fox drama Boston Public in two episodes. He then made his first of four appearances alongside Mary-Kate and Ashley Olsen in the film Holiday in the Sun, which also starred Megan Fox and Brown's good friend Ben Easter. In 2002, Brown got his big break playing Kyle in the ABC sitcom 8 Simple Rules alongside John Ritter, Katey Sagal, and Kaley Cuoco. Brown has more recently appeared in Headless Horseman, The Strip and Detention.

Personal life
Brown is a supporter of the Huntington's Disease Society of America as it has affected his family. He has a walk/run in Los Angeles to raise money for the Huntington's Disease Society of America every autumn.

He appeared on the TV show Street Smarts, where he went under the name Aaron Brown. At the end of the show he won $3800.

Filmography

References

External links

1981 births
American male television actors
American male film actors
Living people
Male actors from Iowa
21st-century American male actors